David Hallyday (born David Michael Benjamin Smet; 14 August 1966) is a French singer, songwriter and amateur sports car racer.

Early life
Hallyday was born in Boulogne-Billancourt and is the son of the French singers Johnny Hallyday and Sylvie Vartan. David Hallyday is a first cousin of actor Michael Vartan. He is the older half-brother of actress Laura Smet.

Career
Hallyday is most known for writing music for others, including a collaboration with his father on the 1999 album Sang pour sang.

He appeared in the teenage comedy He's My Girl (1987), also performing its title theme song.  "He's My Girl" reached #79 on the U.S. Billboard Hot 100 and #72 on Cash Box.  His 1991 album Rock 'n' Heart spawned a bigger hit, "Ooh La La", which reached #51 on the Hot 100.

Personal life
Hallyday married Estelle Lefébure in 1989; they divorced in 2001. They have two children, Emma and Ilona. He married Alexandra Pastor, the daughter of businessman Michel Pastor, in 2004. Their son Cameron was born on 8 October 2004.

Discography

Studio albums
 True Cool (1988)
 Rock 'n' Heart (1990)
 2000 BBF with Blind Fish (1994)
 Novacaine with Novacaine (1997)
 Un Paradis/Un Enfer (1999)
 Révélation (2002)
 Satellite (2004)
 David Hallyday (2007)
 Un Nouveau Monde (2010)
 Le Temps D'une Vie (2016)
 J'ai quelque chose à vous dire (2018)
 Imagine Un Monde (2020)

Live albums
 On the Road (1992)

Singles
 "Tonight You're Mine" (1985)
 "Lady Beware" (1986)
 "He's My Girl" (1987)
 "Rock Revival" (1987)
 "Move" (1988)
 "High" (1988)
 "Rock Revival" (1988)
 "listening" (1989)
 "Wanna Take My Time" (1989)
 "Your Power of Love" (1989)
 "About You" (1990)
 "Rock 'n' Heart (1990)
 "Change of Heart" (1990)
 "Tears of the Earth" (1990)
 "Ooh La La" (1991) 
 "Hold on Blue Eyes" (1992)
 "Héros" (1993) David Hallyday & Blind Fish
 "Pain and Pride (1993) David Hallyday & Blind Fish
 "Natural Child" (1994) David Hallyday & Blind Fish
 "Pour Toi" (1999)
 "Tu ne m'as pas laissé le temps" (1999)
 "Ange Etrange" (2000)
 "Le Manque À Donner" (2000)
 "Repenses-y Si Tu Veux (2002)
 "Un Homme Libre (2002) for the movie "La planète au trésor" 
 "Le Défi" (2004)
 "Satellite" (2004)
 "Steve McQueen" (2004)
 "Ma dernière lettre" (2018)

24 Hours of Le Mans results

References

External links
 Official David Hallyday website
 

1966 births
Living people
French people of Armenian descent
French people of Bulgarian descent
French people of Hungarian-Jewish descent
French people of Belgian descent
24 Hours of Le Mans drivers
People from Boulogne-Billancourt
European Le Mans Series drivers
Blancpain Endurance Series drivers
24 Hours of Spa drivers
Pastor family
Scotti Brothers Records artists

Oreca drivers
Larbre Compétition drivers
W Racing Team drivers
Saintéloc Racing drivers
Lamborghini Super Trofeo drivers